Herbert Elliott Hamblen (December 24, 1849 - April 6, 1908) was an American author. He published his first novel under the name Frederick Benton Williams, but published his other work under his own name.

Bibliography

As Frederick Benton Williams
 On Many Seas:  The Life and Exploits of a Yankee Sailor, edited by William Stone Booth (1897; G. P. Putnam's Sons)

As Herbert Elliot Hamblen
 Tom Benton's luck (1898; Macmillan Publishers)
 The general manager's story; old-time reminiscences of railroading in the United States (1898; Macmillan Publishers; reprinted in 1970 by Gregg Press)
 The yarn of a bucko mate; his adventures in two oceans (1899; Charles Scribner's Sons)
 We win: the life and adventures of a young railroader (1899; Doubleday & McClure)
 The red-shirts : a romance of the old volunteer fire department (1902; Street & Smith)

References

External links
 

1849 births
1908 deaths